Alekos Vosniadis (born 12 April 1961) is a Greek professional football manager who is the current manager of Super League 2 club Apollon Smyrnis.

References

1961 births
Living people
Greek football managers
Apollon Smyrnis F.C. managers
Niki Volos F.C. managers
Athlitiki Enosi Larissa F.C. managers
Veria F.C. managers
Trikala F.C. managers
PAE Kerkyra managers
Iraklis Thessaloniki F.C. managers
Footballers from Thessaloniki